The following is a partial list of aquifers around the world.  A category-based list of aquifers is also available.

North America

Canada
 Arkell Spring Grounds
 Laurentian River System
 Northern Great Plains Aquifer
 Oak Ridges Moraine – north of Toronto Ontario

United States
 Atlantic and Gulf Coastal Plains aquifer
 Biscayne Aquifer
 Bruceian aquifer
 Cambro-Ordovician aquifer system
 California Central Valley aquifer system
 Eastern Snake River Plain Aquifer
 Edwards Aquifer
 Englishtown aquifer
 Floridan aquifer
 Great Miami aquifer
 Kirkwood–Cohansey aquifer
 Lloyd aquifer
 Magothy aquifer – largest of Long Island's aquifers
 Mahomet Aquifer
 Medina aquifer
 Mt. Laurel–Wenonah aquifer
 Ogallala Aquifer, also known as the High Plains Aquifer
 Ozark Plateau aquifer
 Patapsco aquifer
 Permian Sea
 Potomac–Raritan–Magothy aquifer
 Saginaw Aquifer
 San Diego Formation
 San Joaquin River aquifer
 Sankoty Aquifer
 Silurian–Devonian aquifers
 Spokane Valley–Rathdrum Prairie Aquifer

Mexico
 Texcoco aquifer, one of the most overexploited in the country

South America
 Amazon Basin
 Maranhao Basin
 Guarani Aquifer System
 Hamza River

Australia
 Botany Sands Aquifer
 Canning Basin
 Gnangara Mound
 Great Artesian Basin
 Jandakot Mound
 Yarragadee Aquifer

New Zealand
Canterbury Plains Aquifer (Christchurch)

Africa
 Bas Saharan Basin
 Lotikipi Basin Aquifer (Kenya)
 Murzuk-Djado Basin
 Nubian Sandstone Aquifer System

Europe
 Alnarpsströmmen (Sweden)
 Chalk Aquifer (England)
 Paris Basin (France)
 North Caucasus Basin (Russia)
 Russian Platform Basins (Russia)
 Schwyll Aquifer (Wales)
 Upper Rhine aquifer (France / Germany)

Middle-East
 Arabian Aquifer System
 Yarkon-Taninim Aquifer, also known as Mountain Aquifer (Israel-Palestine)

Asia
 Indus Basin
 Ganges-Brahmaputra Basin
 West Siberian Basin
 Tunguss Basin
 Angara-Lena Basin
 Yakut Basin
 North China Aquifer System
 Song-Liao Basin
 Tarim Basin
 Pechora Basin
 Sambai oothu Aquifer (Karaikudi, India)
 Indo-Gangetic Aquifer System

References